KLYR (1360 AM) is a radio station licensed to Clarksville, Arkansas, United States. The station airs a country music format, and is currently owned by Jerry and Marilyn Dietz, through licensee Ozark Communications, Inc.

References

External links
KLYR's website

LYR
Country radio stations in the United States